The discography of Fuel, an American alternative rock band that formed in 1989, consists of 6 studio albums, 4 extended plays, 2 compilation albums, 21 singles, and 13 music videos.

Albums

Studio albums

Compilation albums

Extended plays

Singles

Music videos

References

Discographies of American artists
Rock music group discographies